Les Studdard (born December 14, 1958) is a former American football center. He played for the Kansas City Chiefs in 1982 and for the Houston Oilers in 1983.

References

1958 births
Living people
American football centers
Texas Longhorns football players
Kansas City Chiefs players
Houston Oilers players